Hector Daniel LaSalle (born 1967/1968) is an American lawyer and jurist who is the presiding judge of the New York State Supreme Court, Appellate Division, Second Department. He was unsuccessfully nominated by Governor Kathy Hochul's to serve as chief judge of the New York Court of Appeals, the state's highest court.

LaSalle's nomination drew opposition from a wide variety of Democratic groups and constituencies, including numerous unions and trade groups, criminal justice advocates, elected officeholders, and local party affiliates, who raised concerns about his track record on issues relating to abortion, criminal justice, corporate interests, and the environment. Many also suggested that he would do little to stem – or potentially accelerate – the Court of Appeals' rightward drift under the previous chief judge, Janet DiFiore. Many noted that the state's Commission on Judicial Nominations had the applications of three of the court's more liberal judges, who had frequently disagreed with DiFiore, yet did not include them on the short list they sent Hochul, who promised during her 2022 re-election campaign to appoint a more progressive chief judge.

In January 2023, the state senate's Judiciary Committee narrowly voted to reject the nomination. However, Hochul threatened to sue the senate to force a full vote on the nomination. On February 15, the full Senate overwhelmingly voted to reject LaSalle's nomination. Hochul acknowledged the result shortly thereafter and announced plans to nominate a new candidate.

Early life and education 
Born in Brentwood on Long Island, LaSalle graduated from Brentwood High School. He earned a Bachelor of Arts degree from Pennsylvania State University in 1990 and a Juris Doctor from the University of Michigan Law School in 1993.

Career 
LaSalle served as an assistant district attorney in the Suffolk County District Attorney's office from 1993 to 1998 and as deputy bureau chief of the office's Special Investigation Bureau from 2002 to 2008. LaSalle also worked as an associate at Ruskin Moscou Faltishek, P.C. and served as a Deputy Attorney General in the New York Attorney General's Office, Claims Bureau (Medical Malpractice Section). In 2014, Governor Andrew Cuomo nominated LaSalle to serve as the presiding judge of the New York State Supreme Court, Appellate Division, Second Department.

Nomination as chief judge of the Court of Appeals

In 2022, LaSalle's name was on a list of seven candidates to replace Janet DiFiore as chief judge of the New York Court of Appeals the state's highest judicial position, from a list of candidates, all of whom had applied for the job, chosen by the state's Commission on Judicial Nominations (CJN). Late that December, Governor Kathy Hochul nominated LaSalle. If confirmed, he would be the state's first Latino Chief Judge.

LaSalle's nomination faced substantial opposition from more than a dozen Democratic members of the state senate, labor unions, civil rights groups, the Manhattan Democratic Party, and other Democratic-aligned advocacy groups and organizations, who have criticized LaSalle's record on abortion, labor, and criminal justice cases. Others also objected to his background as a prosecutor, arguing that the higher courts needed a defense lawyer's perspective to balance out the many former prosecutors on those benches. They also recalled that during her recent gubernatorial campaign, Hochul had promised to appoint a strongly liberal and progressive judge to DiFiore's position, in order to reverse what they saw as a conservative drift in a court that had a historical reputation for bold decisions that had advanced liberal causes, especially at a time when the U.S. Supreme Court had become more conservative.

LaSalle's defenders, primarily older Latino Democratic officeholders such as Senator Luis R. Sepúlveda, argued that he was being held to an impossibly high standard because of his ethnicity, even while younger Latino leaders were among LaSalle's fiercest opponents. They also argued that his critics had distorted and misrepresented decisions he had joined to make him appear more conservative than he actually was. Some of the state's major unions, such as the Public Employees Federation, which represents white-collar workers in state government, and the city's Transit Workers Union, criticized their fellow union's opposition and, without endorsing LaSalle, called for him to receive a full Senate vote.

Both sides accused the other of manipulating the process. LaSalle's opponents noted that three other sitting judges on the Court—Rowan Wilson, Shirley Troutman and Jenny Rivera—were also reportedly among the 41 people who applied to the CJN for consideration, but did not make the final list. They noted that those three had frequently dissented in some of the narrowly-decided rulings of the DiFiore Court lamented by liberals, particularly Harkenrider v. Hochul, the 2022 case that invalidated a congressional redistricting map drawn by the legislature after the state's independent redistricting commission had failed to agree on one and assigned the task to a special master. Many Democrats blamed those maps for allowing Republicans enough competitive seats to retake a slight majority in the U.S. House of Representatives.

Four of the 12 members of the CJN are appointed by the Chief Judge; three of the current four were DiFiore appointees. An additional five were appointed by either former governor Andrew Cuomo, who had appointed and strongly supported DiFiore, or Republican legislative leaders. That created a nine-member bloc that might have prevented Rivera, Troutman or Wilson from gaining the necessary seven votes to advance while allowing the more conservative Anthony Cannataro, the only other sitting judge on the Court who applied, to advance. Opponents cited reports that DiFiore's three appointees had, in fact, actively worked to prevent the three liberal judges from reaching the shortlist.

In January 2023, as the legislature reconvened for its new session, Democratic leadership in the state senate expanded the membership of the Judiciary Committee from 15 to 19. The move was described as routine housekeeping, but LaSalle's supporters noted that some of the Democrats newly assigned to the committee, like Jessica Ramos, had already declared their opposition to LaSalle. They have called the new committee "stacked".

Committee vote

The state constitution requires the state senate to act on the nomination within 30 days. On January 18, after a five-hour hearing, the senate's Judiciary Committee voted 10–9 against advancing his nomination to the floor, the first time since New York began filling Court of Appeals vacancies through gubernatorial appointments rather than elections that lawmakers have rejected a nominee. Hochul has suggested she may file suit to force a full Senate vote on LaSalle, arguing that the state constitution requires it.

Committee chair Brad Hoylman-Sigal spoke about his vote against LaSalle with New York afterwards. "I think he most certainly demonstrated that he is a decent individual who pursues public service for the right reasons and has a moving personal story, as well as potentially the historic role of him being the first Latino chief judge", he said. "But at the end of the day, I don't think he sufficiently answered my colleagues' questions about some troubling decisions."

One of those decisions, People v. Bridgeforth, Hoylman-Sigal, like many progressives, found particularly troubling. LaSalle had joined a short unanimous opinion that held a black defendant was not prejudiced by the court granting the prosecutor's peremptory challenge striking all dark-skinned jurors from the pool regardless of race, a decision ultimately reversed by the Court of Appeals on the grounds that the state constitution specifically bars discrimination on the basis of color as well as race. LaSalle and his defenders had said the Appellate Division was bound by precedent, but Hoylman-Sigal had noted that the opinion had not specifically identified the precedent in question, which LaSalle admitted it should have.

Like many of the 5,700 cases LaSalle had heard during his years in the Appellate Division, Bridgeforth was short and offered little explanation for its holding. Hoylman-Sigal noted that LaSalle had only personally authored six of those decisions. The Court of Appeals reversed both of LaSalle's cases that reached it. Hoylman-Sigal noted also that LaSalle had not even completed his application for the position. Lastly, he believed that the backlash LaSalle had provoked made him unlikely to be able to unite a fractious court whose members were openly attacking each other in opinions.

Whether Hochul could have won a suit turned on whether the "of the senate" language in the state constitution is read to mean literally the full senate or not. Former chief judge Jonathan Lippman believes it does, noting that in his experience the nomination of a chief judge was understood in the senate as the one vote that had to reach the floor; Hoylman-Sigal and other LaSalle opponents believe the constitution's provisions that allow both houses of the legislature to make their own procedural rules put the current situation on sufficient constitutional footing. A court might not even consider the question justiciable; Hoylman-Sigal questions whether the Court of Appeals could even even properly hear the case given that four sitting judges applied for the chief position.

It was not even clear that LaSalle would win a vote of the full senate. Since the committee vote, 25 senators, all Democrats, have come out against LaSalle, with three in favor. Opponents would need just seven more votes on their sides to reject the nomination, while Hochul would need eight more Democrats to join all the body's Republicans, whose support is not guaranteed, for confirmation.

Eventually a Republican senator filed the suit, but it was soon mooted when, on February 15, the full Senate voted 39–20 to reject LaSalle. All Democrats present voted against the nomination except Monica Martinez, likewise all Republicans except Mario Mattera were in support. Four senators, including Sepulveda, were absent. Hochul accepted the result and promised to nominate another candidate soon.

Notes

References 

1960s births
Living people
20th-century American lawyers
21st-century American judges
21st-century American lawyers
Hispanic and Latino American judges
Hispanic and Latino American lawyers
New York (state) lawyers
New York (state) state court judges
Pennsylvania State University alumni
University of Michigan Law School alumni